Parzęczewo  is a village in the administrative district of Gmina Kamieniec, within Grodzisk Wielkopolski County, Greater Poland Voivodeship, in west-central Poland.

The village has a population of 639. It has a manor house and park, currently in a state of disrepair, and a wooden church, originally built in the 18th century.

References

Villages in Grodzisk Wielkopolski County